Sideropenic hypochromic anemia is primarily characterized by low serum iron concentration.  Non-sideropenic hypochromic anemia is the ineffective utilisation of iron stores, usually from chronic infection/inflammation. It is very important to distinguish iron deficit anemia from the anemia of chronic disorders so as to ensure specific treatment.

Basic Features
1- Red cell indices and blood film appearances suggest iron deficiency, although peripheral blood changes are not usually as marked as in moderate or severe iron deficiency.

2- Erythropoiesis is abnormal because of ineffective iron utilisation  with poor haemoglobinisation of red cell precursors and

3- Bone marrow iron stores are normal or increased and sideroblasts may be frequent and abnormal.

Causes
1- Secondary anemias

- Chronic infection/inflammation

- Malignancy

2- Thalassaemia

3- Sideroblastic anaemia

"Differentiation from iron deficiency"
The serum iron and total iron-binding capacity (transferrin) are helpful but not diagnostic; it is quite possible to have co-existing ineffective iron utilisation and iron deficiency, as determined by bone marrow iron status, e.g. in rheumatoid arthritis.

References
1-  Aids to clinical haematology (eds; Child J.A. and Cuthbert A.C..

Anemias